Karl Aegerter (16 March 1888 – 12 May 1969) was a prolific Swiss painter, draftsman, etcher, muralist, illustrator, designer and sculptor. Now in numerous private and public collections, Aegerter's works are often likened to those of Edvard Munch.

Childhood
Karl Aegerter was born the third child of a farming family originally from Bern. Karl lost his mother at an early age and his family migrated to the Basel area. Living under extreme economic hardship, the Aegerter family suffered further loss when the farmland they worked on flooded and their possessions almost entirely lost.

At the age of seven, young Karl was given up as a “Verdingbub” (foster child), a common practice in an impoverished Switzerland at the time, as struggling farmers gave up their children to urban foster families for a given period of time. During this time, Karl's older brother and role model, August Samuel Aegerter (Basel 17 October 1878 Basel – I June 1971, Basel), established himself in Basel as an artist, inspiring the young Karl.

Studies and influence 
During his basic schooling, Aegerter worked in factories and construction sites before beginning an apprenticeship as a decorative painter in the 'Fabriken und auf den Bau'. At the age of 27, having saved enough money, Aegerter left Basel to begin his studies in Munich, walking the 400-kilometer distance from Basel to Munich, where he enrolled to study drawing in the private art academy run by Heinrich Knirr. The Knirr Academy is also known for having schooled other Swiss artists such as Paul Klee and Ernst Morgenthaler. In 1926, he returned to Basel.

European travels 
Thereafter, Aegerter undertook several long journeys: in 1923–1924 to Vienna and Budapest, 1924–1925 to Berlin, Dresden and throughout Saxony; in 1927 to Rome, Italy, having received a stipend from Basler “öffentlichen Kunstsammlung”, the City of Basel’s official art collection. He continued in 1927 to Brussels and in 1928 to Paris.
Aegerter also began around this time his lifelong relation with the high alpine region of Switzerland, Graubünden/Grisons. He took a medical retreat in 1924 in the region of St. Moritz, doing so again in 1940–43, and returned again in 1945, having received yet another stipend from the City of Basel to complete a "Study of Graubünden", dedicating himself to landscape painting.

Back to Basel 
Having established his domicile in Basel in the late 1920s, Aegerter became a fixture in the city's thriving and highly political art scene. It was around this time that Aegerter's political engagement intensified, and he joined the Communist Party. In 1926 he met the Basel poet  (Aegerter) (née Elisabeth Hartmann (1895–1955)), who after their marriage in 1930, wrote under her adopted pseudonym Elisabeth (Ae)Gerter. Gerter was a journalist, poet and story writer of the “Social Realism” school. Karl often illustrated her works, many of which were published to great acclaim in Switzerland and are still in print today.

In 1926, Aegerter left aside his artistic activity for a full-time engagement in politics to become the Party Secretary of the Swiss Communist Party in Basel (KP Basel). This continued through the 1930s until the banning of the Party in Switzerland, after which time his political affiliation moved to the Socialist Party (SP). From 1932 to 1941 Aegerter served as an elected official in the City Council of Basel. From 1948, he served additionally as a Judge. During the same time he served for many years as president of the Basel Section of the Swiss Painter & Architects Guild (Gesellschaft Schweizerischer Maler, Bildhauer und Architekten (GSMBA)), founded in 1865 as the first and most powerful artists’ association of Switzerland at the time.   After the Second World War, Aegerter and his wife spent long periods in the Belgian coal mining town of Borinage, completing a full series of paintings depicting the extreme misery and suffering of the workers. Borinage itself had already been made famous in the 1934 silent film of Joris Ivens, “Misere au Borinage”; in the paintings of Henry Luyten of the 1860s of the great strikes of the time; and for being the home town of Vincent van Gogh.

In 1955, after long illness,  died. Later that year, Aegerter married for a second time, this time Marta Buchser.

In 1962, an extensive catalog of Aegerter's works appeared, under the title "Gestalter des Humanen (Designer of Humane), which included a lengthy foreword of texts prepared from colleagues and professional acquaintances. Public recognition of the artist evolved from one major exhibition to another: 1959 in Basel; 1968 in Schloss Arbon; 1980 in Muttenz; 1987 in St-Ursanne; and 1996 in St. Moritz in the Galleria Curtins.
Karl Aegerter died on 5 December 1969 in Basel.

Works 
Karl Aegerter's prolific artistic career emerged as a painter, sketcher, muralist, illustrator, sculptor and designer. His first major series of paintings, entitled "People of Today" (Menschen von Heute), came forth in the 1920s and focused on the themes of poverty and suffering in the aftermath of the First World War.
Other central themes seen in his work related to industrial & mining subjects as well as alpine landscapes, still lives and portraiture.

For Aegerter, art was and remained to the end of his days, a means to an end, a vehicle for the social advancement of humanity, as a tool for changing ideas, exposing injustice, a lament of the wrongs inflicted by man upon his fellow man.  Art without ethical and political engagement would be unthinkable. In these early paintings, his stance of social critique remained very much at the forefront. Poverty, speechlessness, and physical handicaps (a poignant reminder of the hundreds of thousands of soldiers and millions of displaced persons left physically ruined and financially destitute after the First World War) were hereby interpreted, providing us with evocative symbols of the abuse of the human work ethic, a metaphor for the meaninglessness of modern life and existence, in this instance, under the emerging capitalist system, where the individual was obliterated by the greater forces of industry and nation-building that captured the Zeitgeist of inter war period in Europe. His paintings remained for some time grounded in the social criticism that led to his emerging involvement in the Communist Party, where he designed many poster and flyers, and his greater political activism in the City of Basel; whether through art or through politics, the message was change.

During his prolific career, Aegerter experimented with numerous styles, influenced by the various forces at work on the artistic scene, never truly belonging to any one “school”. In his earlier years however, his work was highly expressive, often bleakly theatrical, using a simplified, stereotyped, often succinct painting language, formally representing the message of his work. Dark tones, strong outlined contours, sparing light – all properties which characterize his work from those years, showed his strong affiliation for some time with the Basel School known as the "Dark Tone School" (or the "Dunkeltonigen"), itself a reaction against the Basel painter , a colleague of Henri Matisse, and fellow graduate of the Kunst Academie in Munich. Under the influence of expressionism, over time his palette became lighter and his paintings brighter. The summit of this evolution was expressed in his Borinage series in 1947, resembling the style of the painting of van Gogh and the Fauves. In his alpine landscapes, Aegerter captured the weight and dynamism of the mountains and rushing streams, which urgently subordinated human existence by their weight and dynamism. In his portraits, he centered his work on the working-classes and everyday people, using gloomy dark tones to portray their poverty, their sense of loss and suffering and a general feeling of ill-ease, in a vaguely realistic style
Following in the line of German Expressionism, and following on the First World War, Aegerter chose those who had been marginalized by society the central focus of his work. The working class milieu and the mining communities were at the forefront of his themes. Aegerter had experienced the resulting misery of war first hand and painted this in a dark, powerful fashion – each painting standing as a call for human justice, and global peace.

A large part of his oeuvre comes from his Social Realism phase, culminating in the largest exhibition of the year at the Kunsthalle Bern in 1926, Aegerter exhibited with Käthe Kollwitz. R.R. Junghanns, and Dora Lauterburg amongst others. For ten years thereafter, Aegerter did not exhibit, being fully engaged in politics.

After the war, having completed his Borinage series to much acclaim, there was a growing demand for murals and frescos by Aegerter. During the ensuing decade he completed more than ten murals, none of which have survived except one. These gross format works drew on classical symbolism as well as the Neue Sachlichkeit, with strong clear lines, which his good friend and artistic colleague, had popularized in Switzerland (exhibition in the Kunsthalle Basel 1959, K.A., Niklaus Stoecklin). With the death of his wife Elisabeth Gerter, the human figure disappeared from his painting and his work became more and more focused on architectural subjects and landscapes. Not only did the human figure slowly leave his work, but human suffering as well. His late works offer up generous landscapes, alpine settings, peaceful natural scenes – new horizons and a new palette, working with bright felt pens, a modern development, to layout his later works.  Aegerter's works are prized in numerous private and public collections around the world. His work has often been likened that of Edvard Munch.

Exhibitions 
Solo Exhibitions:

Group Exhibitions:

List of works held in collections 
 "Lesender", "Winterlandschaft", "Passwang", "Arbeitergruppe" und Zeichnungen staatlicher Kunstkredit, Basel (für die öff. Slg., *Kupferstichkabinett), 1941–1944, 1947
 "Die Heimkehr", "Der Fabrikweg"—Schweiz. Eidgenossenschaft, (EDI)
 "Selbstbildnis" Öffentlich Kunstsammlung, Basel
 "Bergarbeiter-Dorf"—1950, Kunstverein Basel, Oil on canvas
 "Humanität"—1957, Mural in Basel, Jakobsberg
 "Arbeiter"—2008, Gift to the Solothurner Kunstmuseums
With the exception of  “Humanität“, all of Aegerter's murals in Basel and the surroundings have been lost as a result of reconstruction

Literature 
 1953 Allgemeines Lexikon der bildenden Künstler des XX. Jahrhunderts
 1953 Schiess, W.S.: Karl Aegerter
 1957 Ein Querschnitt durch das Schaffen des Basler Kunstmalers Karl Aegerter
 1958 Künstlerlexikon der Schweiz. XX. Jahrhundert
 1962 "Gestalter des Humanen", (Werkverzeichnis)
 1992 Allgemeines Künstlerlexikon: Die bildenden Künstler alle Zeiten & Völker
 1998 Biographisches Lexikon der Schweizer Kunst
 2002 Historisches Lexikon der Schweiz (HLS)

References

External links
 k aegerter galerie
 Aegerter, K Kunstverkauf
 
 

20th-century Swiss painters
20th-century Swiss male artists
Swiss male painters
1969 deaths
1888 births